Carlos Alberto Sainz (born 13 December 1937) is a former Argentine association football player.

Sainz began his career in 1958 at Argentinos Juniors, where he played until 1961. In 1962 he moved to Club Atlético River Plate with whom he reached the final of the 1966 Copa Libertadores, where they lost to Uruguayan side C.A. Peñarol. He stayed at River Plate until 1967 and then moved to San Lorenzo from Mar de Plata in 1968 before retiring in 1969.

Sainz was member of the Argentina squad at the 1962 FIFA World Cup, where Argentina were eliminated in the group stage. He appeared in groups stage matches against Bulgaria and Hungary.

External links
 
 Alberto Sainz at BDFA.com.ar 

1937 births
Living people
Argentine footballers
Argentina international footballers
1962 FIFA World Cup players
Argentine Primera División players
Argentinos Juniors footballers
Club Atlético River Plate footballers
Footballers from Buenos Aires
Association football defenders